Loch Lomond Rugby Club is a small Scottish rugby union club that plays in the .

The club was formed in 1996 when Dumbarton and Vale of Leven Rugby Clubs merged in order to increase playing numbers and to pool finances.

The club has a clubhouse and playing / training facilities at its base in Bonhill, 25 miles west of Glasgow and runs a 1st and 2nd XV together with a junior section.

While most of Loch Lomond's short history has been spent trying to stay afloat financially, they have achieved three promotions (2nd place Glasgow District League Division 2 in 1999–00, 2nd place Glasgow District League Division 1 in 2000–01 and as champions of BT National Division 5 West (B) in 2005–06) and one relegation (from BT National League 5 West (A) in 2004–05). They also reached the last-eight of the BT Bowl in 2000–01, and again in 2007–08.

Achievements 

 BT National League 5 West (B):
 Winners : 2005–06
 Glasgow District League Division 1:
 Runners up : 2000–01
 Glasgow District League Division 2:
 Runners up :1999–00
 BT Bowl:
 Quarter Final : 2000–01
 Quarter Final : 2007–08

External links 
 Loch Lomond RFC official site
 Loch Lomond RFC's portal on the SRU Website

References 

Rugby union in West Dunbartonshire
Scottish rugby union teams